Đuraš Ilijić (1326–62) was a nobleman who served the Serbian monarchs Stefan Dečanski (r. 1321–1331), Stefan Dušan (r. 1331–1355) and Uroš V (r. 1355–1371), from 1326 until his death in 1362. He had the title of čelnik ("head"), and governed Upper Zeta. He is an ancestor of the Crnojević noble family (a branch of the Đurašević).

Origin and early life
Đuraš was born in Zeta, the son of Ilija, and grandson of Đuraš Vrančić. His grandfather served King Stefan Milutin (r. 1282–1321) with the court title of stavilac, while his father had the title of kefalija, and governed Zeta. It has been claimed that Đuraš had two brothers, Nikola and Vladin, or one brother, Nikola Vladin.

King Stefan Dečanski's confirmation on the rights of Ragusan merchants dating to March 25, 1326, was attended by vojvoda Mladen, tepčija Vladoje, and čelnik Đuraš Ilijić. At that time the title of čelnik was of a higher rank than stavilac, but lower than kaznac and tepčija, with vojvoda being the supreme title. It is unclear if there was one or several with that title at the court; the next year, Gradislav Vojšić is mentioned as serving the King as čelnik. In the conflict between Stefan Dečanski and his son Dušan in 1331, Đuraš was at the side of Dušan. According to Mavro Orbini (1601), when Dušan took his army from Zeta against his father in Raška, he had with him two advisors, Karavida and Đuraš. Dečanski surrendered in August, and Dušan was crowned King in September.

Klis and Skradin
In early 1355, Emperor Dušan sent an army, led by knight Palman and Đuraš Ilijić, to defend Klis and Skradin which were in the hands of Dušan's sister, Jelena, the widow of Mladen III Šubić, from Hungarian attacks. Jelena was pressured by both Hungary and the Republic of Venice. Palman held Klis, while Đuraš held Skradin. Among Đuraš's army were his brothers, sons and nephews. The army was not able to hold out the pressure of the Hungarian army. The inhabitants were not ready, while there was some indecisive fighting. Emperor Dušan died on December 20, 1355, under unclear circumstances. This was his last activity. On January 10, 1356, Đuraš ceded Skradin to the Republic of Venice, as Dušan had ordered him in case it could not be defended from the Hungarians. Dušan had sought a flotilla from Venice for his planned campaign on Constantinople.

Death
According to Mavro Orbini (1601), the Balšić family started to expand in Lower Zeta after the death of Emperor Dušan, during the weak rule of Emperor Uroš V. In 1360 they held a part of the land between Lake Skadar and the Adriatic Sea. The Balšić brothers continued into Upper Zeta, which was held by Đuraš Ilijić and his relatives, and killed Đuraš and had some of his relatives captured while the rest left the land, "and thus also ruled Upper Zeta". This took place after 1362.

In Prevlaka in the Bay of Kotor, a plate was found, which says, among other things, "Servant of Christ, Joakim, called Đuraš, grandson of stavilac Đuraš" (Раб Христу Јоаким а зовом Ђураш, унук ставиоца Ђураша) and that he was a "fearsome knight of Emperor Stefan [Dušan]" (у цара у Стјепана трети витез). It is agreed that this was the tombstone of Đuraš Ilijić.

He was the progenitor of the Đurašević, the later Crnojević noble family. It has been claimed that he had three sons: Crnoje, Stefan and Dobrovoj, or two sons: Crnoje and Stefan Dobrovoj.

Annotations

References

Sources
, chapters 41 and 44

14th-century Serbian nobility
Generals of Stefan Dušan
People of the Serbian Empire
People of the Kingdom of Serbia (medieval)
Lords of Zeta
Medieval Serbian military leaders
Serbian knights
Crnojević noble family
Serbs of Montenegro
Year of birth unknown
1362 deaths
14th-century Serbian judges
14th-century soldiers
Boyars of Stefan Dušan